Pomacentrus auriventris, commonly known as the goldbelly damselfish, is a species of damselfish found in the western-central Pacific. It occasionally makes its way into the aquarium trade. It grows to a size of 5.5 cm in length.

References

External links
 

auriventris
Taxa named by Gerald R. Allen
Fish described in 1991